Wing Ki Lai or Emma Lai (born March 14, 1988) is a Hong Kong cricketer who plays for Hong Kong women's national cricket team.  She started learning to play cricket while working as a waitress at the Hong Kong Cricket Club.  Just over a year after her first cricket lesson, she travelled to Kuwait as part of the Hong Kong squad, and a year later, she played in her first game for Hong Kong against Thailand.

Lai is often described as the captain of the Hong Kong women's team, and she did captain Hong Kong to the final of the East Asia Women's T20 Championship, in which Hong Kong finished second to China.  However, she has since reverted to being just a player.  In the Women's Big Bash League Twenty20 competition's WBBL02 season in 2016–17, she was the Associate Rookie for Perth Scorchers.

As of early 2017, Lai was a cricket officer for Cricket Hong Kong, running and planning coaching clinics, conducting demonstrations in schools and also doing some promotion.

In May 2021, she was named in Bauhinia Stars' squad for the 2021 Hong Kong Women's Premier League.

References

External links

1988 births
Hong Kong women cricketers
Hong Kong women Twenty20 International cricketers
Living people
Cricketers at the 2014 Asian Games
Asian Games competitors for Hong Kong